Lewis Errol Pulsipher (born January 22, 1951), often credited as Lew Pulsipher, is an American teacher, game designer, and author, whose subject is role playing games, board games, card games, and video games. He was the first person in the North Carolina community college system to teach game design classes, in fall 2004. He has designed half a dozen published boardgames, written more than 150 articles about games, contributed to several books about games, and presented at game conventions and conferences.

Early work 
Pulsipher graduated from Albion College (Albion, MI) in 1973, and earned a Ph.D. in military and diplomatic history from Duke University (1981). He discovered strategic gaming with early Avalon Hill wargames.

In college, he designed many Diplomacy variants; while living in England in the late 1970s he wrote magazine articles about Dungeons & Dragons (D&D), and other role-playing games, and at one time or another was Contributing Editor to Dragon magazine, White Dwarf, and The Space Gamer as well as a columnist for Imagine magazine. He also contributed monsters to TSR's original Fiend Folio, including the Elemental Princes of Evil, denzelian, and poltergeist.

He published what may have been the first science fiction and fantasy game magazine, Supernova (later sold to Flying Buffalo Inc.), as well as other non-commercial magazines. He made presentations at game conventions as early as Origins 82.

He also designed several games published mostly in the 1980s. He is the designer of Dragon Rage, Valley of the Four Winds, and Swords & Wizardry. His game Britannia, was described in an Armchair General review as "one of the great titles in the world of games", and is the progenitor of a series of similar games. He received the 1987 Charles S. Roberts Award Nomination, Best Pre-World War II Boardgame, Britannia for this game.

He taught college-level computer networking, Web development, and game design in North Carolina. He is retired from teaching now.

Later work 
Pulsipher now teaches video game related subjects online through Udemy, writes for Gamasutra and GameCareerGuide, and continues to design board and card games.

He lives with his wife in southeastern North Carolina.

Selected bibliography

Games 
 Pulsipher, Lewis (1978), Diplomacy Games and Variants, Strategy Games LTD
 Swords & Wizardry, Gibsons Games, 1980
 Valley of the Four Winds, Games Workshop, 1980
 Dragon Rage, Dwarfstar Games, 1980 (not to be confused with the PlayStation 2 game Dragon Rage). The title is back in print by Flatlined Games since 2011.
 Britannia, Gibsons Games, 1986. Later editions in the USA (1987), Germany (1991); revised version USA (2006), France, Germany, Spain, and Hungary (2008)
 Sea Kings, Worthington Publishing, 2015
 Stalingrad Besieged, Worthington Publishing, 2019

Video games 
 Lew Pulsipher's Doomstar, Large Visible Machine, 2016, Steam

Book

Articles and book contributions 
 Dragon (various articles)
 White Dwarf (various articles)
 The General Magazine (various articles)
 
 
  (Forthcoming)

References

External links
 Lewis Pulsipher at BoardGameGeek
 PulsipherGames.com website with supplementary and playtesting material for his games, and his articles and presentations
 Pulsipher's game Design blog
 Gamasutra "expert's blog"
 Pulsipher's teaching game design blog
 Board Game Review of "Dragon Rage" at Drake's Flames

1951 births
Albion College alumni
Artists from Detroit
Board game designers
Duke University alumni
Living people
Writers from Detroit
Writers from North Carolina